HTTP header injection is a general class of web application security vulnerability which occurs when Hypertext Transfer Protocol (HTTP) headers are dynamically generated based on user input. Header injection in HTTP responses can allow for HTTP response splitting, session fixation via the Set-Cookie header, cross-site scripting (XSS), and malicious redirect attacks via the location header. HTTP header injection is a relatively new area for web-based attacks, and has primarily been pioneered by Amit Klein in his work on request/response smuggling/splitting.

Sources 
 File Download Injection Offline
 OWASP HTTP request Splitting
 OWASP Testing for HTTP Splitting/Smuggling
 HTTP Smuggling in 2015

See also 
 HTTP request smuggling

References

Web security exploits
Hypertext Transfer Protocol headers